The Great Tsivil (Bolshoy Tsivil' ; , Măn Śaval) or simply Tsivil in its lower course is a river in Chuvashia, Russian Federation, a right tributary of the Volga. Near Tsivilsk the Maly Tsivil joins the Bolshoy Tsivil, forming Tsivil river, which flows into the Volga near Novocheboksarsk. Other major tributaries are the Unga and Kuganar.

References 

Rivers of Chuvashia